is a Japanese professional footballer who plays as a centre back for  club Tokyo Verdy, on loan from Kashima Antlers.

Career statistics

Club
.

References

External links

Profile at Kashima Antlers

1998 births
Living people
Association football people from Osaka Prefecture
Osaka University of Health and Sport Sciences alumni
Japanese footballers
Association football defenders
J1 League players
J2 League players
Kashima Antlers players
Tokyo Verdy players